Stade Nabeulien is a Tunisian professional basketball club from Nabeul.  The club competes in the Championnat National A.  Notable players of the team include senior men's Tunisian national basketball team members Mohamed Hdidane, Nizar Knioua, and Anis Hedidane.

Honours

Domestic competitions
Tunisian League
Champions (8): 1963, 1975, 1989, 1992, 1996, 2006, 2008, 2010
Tunisian Cup
Champions (12): 1966, 1973, 1980, 1990, 1993, 1996, 1997, 2004, 2007, 2008, 2009, 2010

International competitions
Arab Championship
Champions (1): 1997

Notable coaches 
  Vojkan Benčić

In African competitions
FIBA Africa Clubs Champions Cup  (1 appearance)
2008 – Fourth Place

References

External links
AfricaBasket.com Team Page

Basketball teams in Tunisia
Sports clubs in Tunisia